Aleksandr Minayev may refer to:

 Aleksandr Minayev (footballer, born 1954) (1954–2018), Russian football player and coach
 Aleksandr Minayev (footballer, born 1958) (1958–2010), Russian football player and coach